Knockando railway station served the village of Knockando, Moray, Scotland, from 1899 to 1965 on the Strathspey Railway.

History 
The station opened as Dalbeallie on 1 July 1899 by the Great North of Scotland Railway. To the north was a goods yard, to the west was Tamdhu Distillery and on the eastbound platforms were the station building and the signal box. It closed on 18 October 1965.

References

External links
RAILSCOT - Knockando

Disused railway stations in Moray
Former Great North of Scotland Railway stations
Railway stations in Great Britain opened in 1899
Railway stations in Great Britain closed in 1965
1899 establishments in Scotland
1965 disestablishments in Scotland